Mampata is a large village in the Bafatá Region of central Guinea-Bissau. It lies near the northern bank of the Corubal River, southwest of Chumael. 

There is another village named Mampata several kilometres to the southwest, to the west of Quebo.

References

Populated places in Guinea-Bissau
Bafatá Region